The Young Shepherdess is an 1885 painting by William-Adolphe Bouguereau (1825–1905). It is owned by the San Diego Museum of Art.

The painting depicts a barefoot young woman in peasant clothing, turned away from but still facing the viewer. She holds a plant in her hands. See also The Shepherdess, a similar painting by the same artist.

This and similar images by the artist attracted collectors in Europe and America because of their nostalgic content. In such works the artist depicted a variety of poses and expressions, in this case showing the mild curiosity of the girl.

In portraying a shepherdess Bouguereau is working within the pastoral mode or theme, as developed by ancient Greek and Hellenistic artists and poets. French painters who preceded him in this include Claude Lorrain, Poussin, and Watteau.

See also
 File:Jeune bergère, 1868 painting with a nearly identical name, also by Bouguereau

References

External links
 

Paintings by William-Adolphe Bouguereau
1885 paintings
Sheep in art
Paintings in the collection of the San Diego Museum of Art